Bryan Elliott (1930–2015) was a speedway rider from England.

Speedway career 
Bryan Elliott reached the final of the Speedway World Championship in the 1960 Individual Speedway World Championship.

He rode in the top tier of British Speedway from 1954 to 1965, riding for various clubs; between June 1957 and September 1961 he rode in 148 consecutive matches.

He later emigrated to Australia.

World final appearances

Individual World Championship
 1960 -  London, Wembley Stadium - 16th - 0pts

References 

1930 births
2015 deaths
British speedway riders
Coventry Bees riders
Leicester Hunters riders
Halifax Dukes riders